Mary McIvor (born Mary McKeever) was an American actress who was active during Hollywood's silent era. She was married to serial star William Desmond.

Biography 
Mary was born in Barnesville, Ohio, to Elmer McKeever and Bertha Bentley. Her father died six months before she was born.

After moving west, she found work in Hollywood as an actress in Westerns at Triangle, eventually becoming the leading lady for William S. Hart. She married her co-star, William Desmond, in 1919, after becoming his personal secretary. Mary more or less retired from acting in 1920, the year the couple's first daughter Mary was born.

McIvor's health began to sharply decline around 1930. As a result, the family spent time at a beach cottage in her home state in 1932; during their trip, McIvor wandered off and was reported missing. In April 1939, Desmond reported his wife missing again from their apartment in Los Angeles; she was found wandering the streets of Hollywood nine days later and subsequently treated by doctors for amnesia. The pair remained married until her death in 1941 of a heart attack.

Partial filmography 

 The Burning Trail (1925)
 The Right Man (1929)
 In His Brother's Place (1919)
 Chasing Rainbeaux (1919)
 The Mints of Hell (1919)
 Gambling in Souls (1919)
 The Sudden Gentleman (1917)
 A Phantom Husband (1917)
 Flying Colors (1917) 
 The Square Deal Man (1917) 
 Paddy O'Hara (1917)

References 

American film actresses
American silent film actresses
20th-century American actresses
1897 births
1941 deaths
Actresses from Ohio
Western (genre) film actresses